Ramiro Oliveros is a Spanish film and television actor.

Selected filmography
 Spanish Fly (1975)
 Naked Therapy (1975)
 Death's Newlyweds (1975)
 La cruz del diablo (1975)
 The Pyjama Girl Case (1977)
 Yellow Hair and the Fortress of Gold (1984)

References

Bibliography
 Goble, Alan. The Complete Index to Literary Sources in Film. Walter de Gruyter, 1999.

External links

1941 births
Living people
Spanish male film actors
Spanish male television actors
People from Madrid